Ram Sethi (born 15 November 1938), also known as Pyarelal, is an Indian actor who works in the Bollywood industry. Sethi has worked in many films as a main or supporting character in his long career of 6 decades.

Biography
Ram Sethi (Pyarelal) entered the Indian film industry in 1969, and started off his career as an assistant to Ravi Tandon (the father of Raveena Tandon). After doing some free-lance work, he joined Prakash Mehra, and was employed as his right-hand man for over 20 years. Here he did many projects with actors like Amitabh Bachchan, Jeetendra, Shashi Kapoor, Vinod Khanna, Raaj Kumar, Anil Kapoor, Sanjay Dutt, Sridevi, Smita Patil, Parveen Babi, Pran, Amjad Khan and many other new actors.

He has worked as an actor/writer/director for many movies in the last 46 years. Along with these skills, he also worked as an assistant director, screenplay writer, dialogue writer; and independently directed Ghungroo, starring Shashi Kapoor, Smita Patil, and Waheeda Rehman. He appeared in comical roles with Amitabh Bachchan in several films (Sethi's most notable appearances along with Bachchan include Namak Halaal, Zanjeer, Muqaddar Ka Sikandar and Kaalia).

He currently resides in Versova, Mumbai and is working as an actor, screenplay writer, consulting director and advisor for film-making.

Filmography

Rambhajjan Zindabaad (2017)
P.K. (2014)
Khelein Hum Jee Jaan Sey (2010) - Rehman Chacha
Judwaa (1997) -  Waiter
Roop Ki Rani Choron Ka Raja (1993) - Abu Aslam Ghanvi
Hum Nahin Sudharenge
Tum Jiyo Hazaron Saal (2002) - Gangaram
Shikaar (2000 film) - as Ram Shethi
Deewana Mastana (1997) - Man asking for discount for train tickets
Aurat Aurat Aurat (1996)
Return of Jewel Thief (1996)
Policewala Gunda (1995)- Damodar
Hum Sab Chor Hain (1995) - Peter
Guneghar (1995) - Mujahaideen
Vartmaan (1995)
Hum Hain Bemisaal (1994)
Tahalka (1992) - Laurel (of Laurel and Hardy fame)
Ranbhoomi (1991) - Pyarelal
Jaan Ki Kasam (1991) - Mittal
Baap Numbri Beta Dus Numbri - as postman
Jaadugar (1989) - Pyarelal
Hum To Chale Pardes (1988) - Dr. Sethi
Sone Pe Suhaaga (1988) - Interviewer
Imaandaar (1987) - C. C. Mathur
Muqaddar Ka Faisla (1987) - Pyare Badshah
Tan-Badan (1986) - Dinu
Chameli Ki Shaadi (1986) - Natthulal
Kabhie Ajnabi The (1985)
Sweekar Kiya Maine (1983) - Chandu "Dahejiya"
Ashanti (1982) - Police Inspector Mirza
Gumsum (1982)
Namak Halaal (1982) - Bhairon
Yaarana (1981) - Etiquette Instructor
Kaalia (1981) - Crippled Prisoner
Laawaris (1981) - Harnaman
Jiyo To Aise Jiyo (1981)
Jwalamukhi (1980 film) - Chamanlal Pabara
Red Rose (1980) - Murli Manohar - Manager
Patita (1980) - Moti
Do Aur Do Paanch (1980) - Pyarelal (Guest Appearance)
Jhootha Kahin Ka (1979) - Hotel Waiter
Hum Tere Ashiq Hain (1979) - Nawab Mirza Bahadur Dauliya
Muqaddar Ka Sikandar (1978) - Pyarelal "Awara"
Hera Pheri (1976) - The Casino Drunk
Himalay Se Ooncha (1975) - Plane Passenger who tested the calling button
Kasauti (1974) - Balu (Man who whistles at Sapna)
Ek Kunwari Ek Kunwara (1973) - Tenant
Hanste Zakhm (1973) - Ganesh
Zanjeer (1973) - Constable
Kala Parvat (1971) - Farmer
Jewel Thief 1967

Award nominations
 1979 - Filmfare Award for Best Performance in a Comic Role - Muqaddar Ka Sikandar

References

External links

Living people
Indian male film actors
Male actors in Hindi cinema
Hindi-language film directors
Indian male screenwriters
20th-century Indian male actors
21st-century Indian male actors
1938 births